Nanotech metallurgy (also called nanotechnology enabled metallurgy, or nanometallurgy) is an emerging interdisciplinary domain of materials science and engineering (especially metallurgy), manufacturing, and nanoscience and engineering to study how nanophases (both ex situ and in situ) can be applied to significantly improve the processing/manufacturing, micro/nano-structures, and physical/chemical/mechanical behaviors of metals and alloys. This definition was first proposed by Xiaochun Li  at the University of California, Los Angeles in 2018.

High performance metals and alloys offer potential to improve energy efficiency and system performance. While conventional metallurgical methods have reached certain limits, nanotech metallurgy has the potential to break the traditional barriers in the metals processing and manufacturing technologies. It has a wider scientific and technological reach beyond the concept of metal matrix nanocomposites (MMNCs), as the study of MMNCs normally focuses on how nanoparticles (generally of high volume fractions) are used to tune material properties only. With the development of more scalable methods of nanophase synthesis, incorporation, and dispersion for mass manufacturing, the metals and alloys produced by nanotech metallurgy are becoming more and more economical. Recently the discovery of a nanoparticle self-dispersion and stabilization mechanism in molten metals gives a scientific and technical foundation for scalable manufacturing in nanotech metallurgy.

Fundamental concepts 
Nanotech metallurgy covers research areas such as nanophase effects on processing/manufacturing, materials properties (e.g. mechanical, physical and chemical properties), synthesis and production of nanophases (both in situ and ex situ), interaction between nanophases and molten metal, solidification, and thermomechanical processing of metals containing nanophases.

Nanophase effects on metals processing and manufacturing 
Nanophases can be effectively used to tune microstructures of metals and alloys during solidification and thermomechanical deformation, to control recrystallization at elevated temperatures, and to break traditional metallurgical barriers, thus creating exciting new spaces in processing and manufacturing, such as in casting, thermoplastic deformation, welding/joining, heat treatment, and machining, etc..

Nanophase effects on materials properties 
Nanophases have significant effects on mechanical, physical and chemical properties of metals. As compared with conventional metal matrix composites (MMCs) that are reinforced by micro-scale phases, the addition of nanophases is promising to overcome many disadvantages of MMCs such as poor ductility, machinability and low fracture toughness. For example, a super-strong but lightweight metal with extremely high specific strength and modulus was developed by disperse ceramic silicon carbide nanoparticles in magnesium.

Nanophases synthesis and production 
Nanotech metallurgy covers the synthesis, production and incorporation of nanophases (e.g. nanoparticles, nanowires, nanosheets, carbon nanotubes (CNTs), graphene, etc.). To utilize the cutting edge nanotechnology to metallurgy, the scalability and cost of the nanophases are the major concerning factors to evaluate the feasibility. It is worth to mention that, with the rapid development of nanophase synthesis, production, incorporation, and dispersion, the cost of nanophases are becoming increasingly economical for metallurgy. Recent studies (e.g. molten salt reaction, in-situ reaction etc.) on molten salt based nanophase synthesis and incorporation indicatefurther ways to reduce the cost of nanophases and open up wider applications

Nanoparticles and molten metal interactions 
The interactions between nanophases and molten metal include wetting, incorporation, mixing and dispersion.

Wetting is the key factor for effective incorporation and dispersion
 Incorporation methods including molten salt enabled incorporation, ultrasonic, semi-solid fabrication could be used.
 Mixing: mechanical mixing by propeller, ultrasonic streaming effect and electromagnetic stirring
Dispersion and stabilization of nanoparticles in melts.

Solidification of metals containing nanophases 
Researchers have utilized the nanoparticles to refine the grain for different alloys(e.g. Al alloy, Mg alloy, etc.) during solidification including casting, welding, 3D printing, etc. They can modify the grain size by serving as heterogeneous nucleation site or inhibiting grain growth during solidification. Nanoparticles can help to refine the secondary phase as well.

Nucleation
 Phase growth control
 Pushing/Capture
Viscosity

Thermomechanical processing  

 Heat treatment
 Extrusion
 Rolling
 Welding
 Other Machining

Current research activities 

In situ and ex situ synthesis, production, and incorporation of nanoparticles
 Pseudo phase diagrams of alloys with nanoparticles
 Materials design and modelling
 Nanoparticle dispersion and distribution in metals and alloys
 Fundamental study on nanoparticle interactions with molten metal and solidification fronts (e.g. nanoparticle incorporation, wettability, mixing, distribution, dispersion, stability, pushing and capture, etc.)
 Nanoparticle induced micro/nano-structure refinement and modification
 Nanoparticle effects on thermomechanical processing and manufacturing, including heat treatment, thermoplastic deformation, welding/joining, and machining, etc.
 Nanoparticle effect on mechanical/physical/chemical behaviours of metals and alloys, such as strengthening mechanisms, fatigue resistance, electrical and thermal performance, and corrosion resistance, etc.
 Additive Manufacturing of metals with nanoparticles
 Processing of metal powders containing nanoparticles
 High energy beam interactions with metals containing nanoparticles
 Development and integration of scale up processing and manufacturing systems
 Functional testing methods
 Sustainability and life cycle analysis

Applications 
Nanotech metallurgy can be applied to a wide range applications including automobile, sports, biomedical, electrical and electronics, aerospace, and defense s, etc.

See also 
 Nanotechnology
 Metallurgy
 Metal matrix nanocomposites
 Nanoparticles
 Metal
 Alloys
 Manufacturing
 Scale up production
 Nanoparticle enabled phase modification
 Material properties

References 

Metallurgy
Nanotechnology